Cymindis elegans is a ground beetle species in the genus Cymindis, in the subfamily Lebiinae and tribe Lebiini. It is found in Virginia in the United States.

References

External links 

 Cymindis elegans at bugguide.net

elegans
Beetles described in 1848
Insects of the United States